Ganzhou, alternately romanized as Kanchow, is a prefecture-level city in the south of Jiangxi province, China, bordering Fujian to the east, Guangdong to the south, and Hunan to the west. Its administrative seat is at Zhanggong District.

History

Early settlement and administration 
In 201 CE, Emperor Gaozu of Han established a county in the territory of modern Ganzhou. In the early years, Han Chinese settlement and authority in the area was minimal and largely restricted to the Gan River basin. The river, a tributary of the Yangtze via Poyang Lake, provided a route of communication from the north as well as irrigation for rice farming.

Sui dynasty 
During the Song, immigration from the north bolstered the local population and drove local aboriginal tribes into admixing with the nornterners. After the fall of the capital to the Jin in 1126 in the Jingkang Incident, immigration increased dramatically.

Song dynasty 
In 1153, under the Southern Song, Qianzhou was abolished, and re-organized as Ganzhou, the same name as the present-day city.

Yuan dynasty 

Qing dynasty 
During the late 1800s Ganzhou was opened as one of the southern treaty ports and became a minor base for foreign companies.

Republic of China 
In 1912, the Republic of China abolished the area's dynasty-era subdivisions, replacing them all with counties administered by the provincial government of Jiangxi. In 1914, the province of Jiangxi was divided into four circuits, one of which being , which ruled the area of present-day Ganzhou. In 1926, Gannan Circuit was abolished, and its counties were again directly administered by the Jiangxi provincial government. In 1932, the province established , and the area of present-day Ganzhou was split between the 9th, 11th, 12th, and 13th Administrative Inspectorates. In subsequent years, the area would be reorganized to be divided between various Administrative Inspectorates.

Chinese Soviet Republic 
Beginning in 1928, the Chinese Communist Party began operating in the area, and by June 1930, a local soviet had formed and began governing a number of counties in the region. During the subsequent years, Ganzhou was governed by the Jiangxi–Fujian Soviet. Beginning in February 1934, Communist Party forces in the area began to lose territory to Kuomintang forces (Fifth encirclement). From then until March 1935, the Soviet gradually lost territory with only five northeastern counties left in Ganzhou as of early October 1934 until it collapsed.

Gannan New Deal 

Between 1939 and 1945, Chiang Ching-kuo, son of Chiang Kai-shek, was appointed by the Government of the Republic of China as commissioner of Ganzhou Prefecture (mountain South), then the name of the surrounding regions of Ganzhou. There he banned opium smoking, gambling and prostitution, studied governmental management, allowed for economic expansion and a change in social outlook. His efforts were hailed as a miracle in the political war in China, then coined as the "Gannan New Deal". During his time in Gannan, from 1940 he implemented a "public information desk" where ordinary people could visit him if they had problems, and according to records, Chiang Ching-kuo received a total of 1,023 people during such sessions in 1942. In regards to the ban on prostitution and closing of brothels, Chiang implemented a policy where former prostitutes became employed in factories. Due to the large number of refugees in Ganzhou as a result from the ongoing war, thousands of orphans lived on the street; in June 1942, Chiang Ching-kuo formally established the Chinese Children's Village in the outskirts of Ganzhou, with facilities such as a nursery, kindergarten, primary school, hospital and gymnasium.

People's Republic of China 
On August 14, 1949, the People's Liberation Army established control of Gan County. In June 1951, Ganzhou Prefecture was established.

In February 1999, Ganzhou was changed from a prefecture to a prefecture-level city.

Administration

Ganzhou has jurisdiction over 3 districts, 2 county-level cities, 13 counties:

District
Zhanggong District
Nankang District
Ganxian District

County-level cities
Ruijin
Longnan

Counties
Yudu County
Xingguo County
Ningdu County
Shicheng County
Huichang County
Xunwu County
Anyuan County
Dingnan County
Quannan County
Xinfeng County
Dayu County
Chongyi County
Shangyou County

Geography

More than 70% of its administrative area is forested, and over 83% is also mountainous. Several of the major tributaries of the Gan River, Ganzhou's namesake, join at a confluence in the center of the city. Bordering prefecture-level cities are:

Fujian:
Sanmingeast
Longyaneast

Guangdong:
Meizhousouth
Heyuansouth
Shaoguansouth

Hunan:
Chenzhouwest

Jiangxi:
Ji'annorth
Fuzhounorth

Climate
Ganzhou has a humid subtropical climate (Köppen Cfa) affected by the East Asian monsoon, with long, humid, very hot summers and cool and drier winters with occasional cold snaps. With monthly percent possible sunshine ranging from 20% in March to 62% in July, the city receives 1,778 hours of bright sunshine annually. After the heavy rains subside in June, summer is especially sunny. Autumn is warm and relatively dry.

Demographics
Its population was 8,970,014 at the 2020 Chinese census whom 2,588,060 in the built-up (or metro) area made of Zhanggong, Nankang, and Ganxian Districts.

Vital statistics 
As of 2019, Ganzhou's birth rate is 12.96 per 1,000.

Ethnic groups 
More than 99% of the city's population is Han Chinese. The city's ethnic minorities total 71,200 people, in 41 different ethnic groups. The largest minority populations in the city are the She, Hui and Yao. Ganzhou also contains the largest Hakka community in Jiangxi.

Economy 
As of 2021, Ganzhou's gross domestic product (GDP) totaled ¥416.9 billion, an 9.5% increase from the previous year. Of this, ¥37.632 billion (10.83%) came from the city's primary sector, ¥136.819 billion (39.38%) came from the city's secondary sector, and ¥172.983 billion came (49.79%) from the city's tertiary sector. The city's GDP per capita totaled ¥35,341.74.

As of 2019, the per capita disposable income of the Ganzhou's urban residents totaled ¥34,826, and the per capita disposable income of the Ganzhou's rural residents totaled ¥11,941.

In 2011, Ganzhou's gross domestic product totaled ¥133.598 billion.

Tourism

Ganzhou is known as the "Orange Capital of the World"  as well as the "Tungsten Capital of the World". The world's largest mechanical clock is located in Ganzhou called the Harmony Clock Tower, which was manufactured by UK-based clockmakers Smith of Derby Group. Though encircled by mountain scenery, other notable attractions in Jiangxi are Jingdezhen, Nanchang and Lushan among others. Some of the places of interest in Ganzhou include:
 Mount Jiulian, Longnan County
 Mei Pass, Dayu County
 Cuiwei Peak, Ningdu County
 Hakka architecture: Some of the most representative Hakka houses include Guanxi Xinwei of Longnan; Yanji Wei, of Yangcun; Longguang Wei of Taojiang; and Dongsheng Wei of Anyuan, etc.
 Yugu Pavilion, Zhanggong District
 Bajing Pavilion, Zhanggong District
 Dongjin Bridge: Pontoon bridges have been constructed over the Zhang and Gong rivers since the Song dynasty. The Dongjin Bridge is one that can still be seen. It is 400 metres long, made up of wooden planks placed on around 100 wooden boats linked together with iron chains.

Zhanggong has a city wall dating to the Song dynasty, as well as a number of pavilions and Buddhist and Taoist temples from the Ming and Qing.  Altogether there are some 17 National Cultural Relic Protection Units in Ganzhou and 48 Provincial-level Cultural Relic Protection Units.

Press
Ganzhou Daily covers news about Ganzhou.

Transportation

Roads and highways
China National Highways: G 105, G 206, G 319, G 323.
Expressways of China: G45 Daqing–Guangzhou Expressway and G76 Xiamen–Chengdu Expressway.

Railway

The Beijing-Jiulong Railway goes through Ganzhou from north to south, and it meets the Ganzhou–Longyan Railway (Ganlong line) at East Ganzhou Railway Station in Zhanggong District. Nanchang–Shenzhen high-speed railway is under construction. The Ganzhou–Shenzhen high-speed railway opened on 10 December 2021 and connects Ganzhou with Shenzhen.

Major railway stations in Ganzhou are:

Ganzhou, Xingguo, Nankang, Xinfeng, Longnan and Dingnan (Beijing-Jiulong Railway)
Ganxian, Yudu, Huichang, Ruijin (Ganzhou-Longyan Railway)

Air

The new Ganzhou Huangjin Airport, located in Nankang, was opened on March 26, 2008. Its name inherited from the old Huangjin Airport in Huangjin Town, Zhanggong District, which was closed since it was too close to the expanding Ganzhou urban area.  It has domestic routes to Shenzhen, Guangzhou, Nanchang, Xiamen, Nanjing, Shanghai, Nanning, Chongqing and Beijing.

Notable residents

Nobel Laureate Gao Xingjian (Nobel Prize for literature in 2000) was born in Ganzhou.
Nobel Artist Hu Zhiying was born November 12, 1959, in Ganzhou.
Actress Zhu Xijuan was born in Ganzhou.
Professor Li Peng was born in Ganzhou.

Sister cities
 McAllen, Texas, United States, since 1994.
 Roissy-en-France, Val-d'Oise, France, since 2008.
 Freetown, Sierra Leone, since 2008.
 Brunswick, Georgia, United States, since 2008.
 Phocis, Greece, since 2011. twinning
 Limeira, São Paulo, Brazil, since 2013.

Notes

External links

Ganzhou, Jiangxi (Chinese) 

 
Cities in Jiangxi
Prefecture-level divisions of Jiangxi